Zdravko Savanović is a Serbian paralympic sport shooter. He participated at the 2020 Summer Paralympics in the shooting competition, being awarded the silver medal in the mixed 50 m rifle prone event. Savanović also participated at the 2016 Summer Paralympics in the shooting competition, winning no medal.

References

External links 
Paralympic Games profile

Living people
Place of birth missing (living people)
Year of birth missing (living people)
Serbian male sport shooters
Paralympic shooters of Serbia
Paralympic silver medalists for Serbia
Paralympic medalists in shooting
Shooters at the 2016 Summer Paralympics
Shooters at the 2020 Summer Paralympics
Medalists at the 2020 Summer Paralympics